Hayad is a village de jure in the Kalbajar District of Azerbaijan, but de facto in the Martakert Province of the self-proclaimed Republic of Artsakh.

References 

Populated places in Kalbajar District